The 5th (British Columbia) Field Artillery Regiment, RCA is a Canadian Army Reserve artillery regiment based at the Bay Street Armoury in Victoria, British Columbia. It is part of the 3rd Canadian Division's 39 Canadian Brigade Group. Although having served for nearly one-hundred and sixty years as a field artillery unit, the early history of the regiment is inextricably intertwined with the defences of the naval base at Esquimalt. The regiment is currently equipped with  C3 towed 105mm gun-howitzers.

The regiment's museum is located in the Bay Street Armoury and is open to the public on Tuesday evenings.

Allocated Batteries
55th Field Battery, RCA
56th Field Battery, RCA

55 and 56 Batteries were redesignated as 155 and 156 Batteries on 21 May 2016 - no source referenced provided*

Lineage

75th (British Columbia) Heavy Anti-Aircraft Regiment, RCA
Originated 12 October 1883 in Victoria, British Columbia as the British Columbia Provisional Regiment of Garrison Artillery
Redesignated 7 May 1886 as the British Columbia Brigade of Garrison Artillery
Redesignated 1 January 1893 as the British Columbia Battalion of Garrison Artillery
Redesignated 1 January 1895 as the 5th "British Columbia" Battalion of Garrison Artillery
Redesignated 28 December 1895 as the 5th "British Columbia" Regiment of Garrison Artillery, CA
Reorganized 1 July 1896 into 1st Battalion and 2nd Battalion, the 5th "British Columbia" Regiment of Garrison Artillery, CA
2nd Battalion was detached 1 August 1899, converted to infantry and redesignated the 6th Battalion Rifles (now The British Columbia Regiment (Duke of Connaught's Own) (RCAC). The 1st Battalion designation was automatically discontinued.
Redesignated 2 February 1920 as the 5th (British Columbia) Regiment, Canadian Garrison Artillery
Redesignated 1 July 1925 as the 5th (British Columbia) Coast Brigade, CA
Redesignated 3 June 1935 as the 5th (British Columbia) Coast Brigade, RCA
Redesignated 7 November 1940 as the 5th (Reserve) (British Columbia) Coast Brigade, RCA
Redesignated 1 April 1946 as the 5th (British Columbia) Coast Regiment, RCA
Redesignated 5 February 1948 as the 5th (British Columbia) Heavy Anti-Aircraft Regiment, RCA
Redesignated 29 September 1949 75th (British Columbia) Heavy Anti-Aircraft Regiment, RCA
Amalgamated 17 October 1954 with the 5th (British Columbia) Coast Regiment, RCA, the 120th Heavy Anti-Aircraft Battery, RCA (redesignated as the 120th Harbour Defence Troop, RCA) and the 8th Anti-Aircraft Operations Room, RCA, and redesignated as the 5th West Coast Harbour Defence Battery, RCA
Redesignated 25 October 1956 as the 5th Independent Medium Battery, RCA, with the 120th Harbour Defence Troop, RCA ceasing its amalgamation
Redesignated 25 April 1958 as the 5th (British Columbia) Independent Medium Battery, RCA
Redesignated 12 April 1960 as the 5th (British Columbia) Independent Medium Artillery Battery, RCA
Redesignated 28 February 1965 as the 5th (British Columbia) Field Battery, RCA and allocated to the 15th Field Artillery Regiment, RCA
Detached 1 September 1967 from the 15th Field Artillery Regiment, RCA, to operate as an independent battery
Reorganized 13 September 1991 as a regiment and redesignated as the 5th (British Columbia) Field Artillery Regiment, RCA

5th (British Columbia) Coast Regiment, RCA
Originated 28 October 1948 in Victoria, British Columbia as the British Columbia Coast Regiment, RCA
Redesignated 29 September 1949 as the 5th (British Columbia) Coast Regiment, RCA
Amalgamated 17 October 1954 with the 75th (British Columbia) Heavy Anti-Aircraft Regiment, RCA, the 120th Heavy Anti-Aircraft Battery, RCA, and the 8th Anti-Aircraft Operations Room, RCA

8th Anti-Aircraft Operations Room, RCA
Originated 15 December 1936 in Esquimalt, British Columbia as the 17th Fortress Company, RCE
Converted 1 March 1939 to artillery and redesignated as the 17th Searchlight Battery, RCA (Coastal Defence)
Redesignated 7 November 1940 as the 17th (Reserve) Searchlight Battery, RCA (CD)
Redesignated 1 April 1946 as the 8th Anti-Aircraft Gun Operations Room, RCA
Redesignated 30 June 1951 as the 8th Anti-Aircraft Operations Room, RCA
Amalgamated 17 October 1954 with the 5th (British Columbia) Coast Regiment, RCA, the 75th (British Columbia) Heavy Anti-Aircraft Regiment, RCA, and the 120th Heavy Anti-Aircraft Battery, RCA

Perpetuations

The Great War
58th Field Battery, CFA, CEF
12th Siege Battery CFA CEF

See also 

 Military history of Canada
 History of the Canadian Army

References

External links
5th (British Columbia) Field Artillery Regiment, RCA Official Homepage

Field artillery regiments of Canada
Military units and formations of British Columbia
Organizations based in Victoria, British Columbia
Military units and formations established in 1991